Acoustic Alchemy is an English smooth jazz band formed in England in the early 1980s by Nick Webb and Simon James.

1981–1989: Early days
Acoustic Alchemy was formed around the acoustic guitars of Simon James (nylon string) and Nick Webb (steel string), often backed up by double bass, percussion, and string quartet the Violettes. The band made two albums that were unprofitable. In the mid-1980s, James left, and in the 1990s he formed Kymaera, a similar, though more Latin oriented band.

In 1985, Webb discovered Greg Carmichael, a guitarist with a London pub band called the Holloways (not affiliated with the indie band of the same name), who became James' successor. The new pairing found work as an in-flight band on Virgin Atlantic flights to and from the United States. Six weeks after sending demos to MCA, the band was called to record their first album, which was released in 1987 titled Red Dust and Spanish Lace. Appearing on the album were Mario Argandoña on percussion and Bert Smaak on drums. The album was the first of many to be recorded at the Hansa Haus Studios, in Bonn, Germany, where they met sound engineer Klaus Genuit, who worked on many of the band's albums. Two more albums followed for MCA: Natural Elements (1988) and Blue Chip (1989). The title track from Natural Elements became the theme music for the BBC TV programme Gardeners' World.

1990–1998: Mainstream success
Acoustic Alchemy were soon moved to jazz label GRP as MCA bought GRP in February 1990. Six more albums followed, starting with Reference Point (1990), featuring a cover of "Take Five" by Dave Brubeck and Back on the Case (1991). Reference Point was nominated for a Grammy Award. Webb uncovered fourteen early tracks from 1982 to 1987 featuring Simon James, which were released on the compilation Early Alchemy (1992). The New Edge (1993) and Against the Grain (1994) followed.

For their eighth album, Arcanum (1996), the band re-recorded some of its popular tracks. The album was recorded in London's Pinewood Studios with the string section of the London Metropolitan Orchestra. The collection included three new tracks, "Columbia", "Something She Said", and "Chance Meeting". Personnel on the recording was Webb, Carmichael, Sheppard, Murphy and Parsons. It was produced by Aubry "Po" Powell, who worked with Pink Floyd, Paul McCartney, Jimmy Page, and Robert Plant.

Positive Thinking (1998) was to be Acoustic Alchemy's last album with original frontman Nick Webb. It was recorded over a week in a large house in Monkton Combe, near Bath, England. Recorded by Steve Jones, the musicians were Greg Carmichael (guitar), John Sheppard (drums), and Dennis Murphy (bass).

Webb was diagnosed with pancreatic cancer before working on the album and died on 5 February 1998.

1999: Reform and changes
After Webb's death, Greg Carmichael brought in Miles Gilderdale as his partner, and the band moved label to Higher Octave Music. The debut album on the label, The Beautiful Game, (2000) was more experimental, borrowing from several genres of music. It featured the introduction of Anthony "Fred" White on keyboards.

AArt (2001) was released a year later and was nominated for a Grammy Award for Best Contemporary Instrumental Album.

Radio Contact (2003) contained "Little Laughter", the band's first song with a vocal, performed by Jo Harrop. Harrop was a backing vocalist who was discovered by Gilderdale during a session with Latin singer Enrique Iglesias.

Early in 2006, bassist Frank Felix left the band to concentrate on other projects. The position was filled by two bass players: former Incognito and Down to the Bone bassist Julian Crampton for UK dates and guitarist Gary Grainger (brother of longtime drummer Greg Grainger) in the U.S.

GRP re-released a concert/documentary video of Acoustic Alchemy entitled Best Kept Secret on 25 July 2006.

This Way (2007) included guest appearances by trumpeter Rick Braun and Down to the Bone. Roseland followed in 2011.

Discography

Singles
 "The Earl of Salisbury's Pavane", GRP Christmas album Vol. 2 (1991)

DVDs
 Sounds of St. Lucia: Live (2003)
 Best Kept Secret (2006, re-release of VHS from 1998)

Albums

References

External links
 Official website

GRP Records artists
MCA Records artists
English jazz ensembles
Musical groups established in the 1980s
Smooth jazz ensembles